Bhargava Ramudu  is a 1987 Indian Telugu-language action film produced by S. Jaya Rama Rao under the Jaya Productions banner, presented by Rao Gopal Rao and directed by A. Kodandarami Reddy. It stars Nandamuri Balakrishna, Vijayashanti  and music composed by Chakravarthy.

Plot
The film begins with Minster Rajashekaram a spurious want to hold the ratification of a government project Jala Ganga. He gets ahead of venal an assistant engineer and slays him as he refused. Bhargav is an unemployed engineering graduate who strives for a livelihood. He lives with his mother Parvati and deserts his father owing to his recreant for evading them. He appeals for the position of deceased assistant engineer. Rajashekaram influences Chief Engineer Bhanogi Rao father of Bhargav’s beau Latha to stand it for his person. However, Bhargav acquires the job with his merit. 

Just before his joining, Parvati falls sick and dies because of a flub made by a doctor. Knowing it, Bhargav assaults him and is apprehended but acquits him with the support of Latha’s uncle DIG Pratap Rao. Now Bhargav takes charge when Rajashekaram forces him to tamper with the project, uses his power, and threat, and also lusts him with a worse Roja but fails. Moreover, his acquaintance reforms Roja. Due to his no kind of submission, Rajashekaram arraigns him for bribing and penalized him. In the prison, Bhargav is aware of his father Tagore’s presence therein and rebukes him.

Accordingly, Tagore spins rearward, he is a labor union leader while Rajashekaram is an MP who ploys to squat their colony which he opposes. Hence, Rajashekaram is in cahoots with Tagore’s henchmen Janardhan airs Tagore as a swindler and expels them. Thus, enraged Tagore seeks to kill Rajashekaram Janardhan dies and his daughter is left alone. Listening to it, Bhargav pleads pardon and embraces his father. Being cognizant of it, Rajashekaram intrigues to slaughter Bhargav when Tagore sacrifices his life. Soon after release, Bhargav inflames with vengefulness and challenges Rajashekaram. In tandem, he learns Roja is Janardhan’s daughter, and with her assistance, Bhargav accumulates the pieces of evidence against Rajashekaram. At last, Bhargav ceases the baddies when Roja eliminates Rajashekaram and surrenders. Finally, the movie ends on a happy note with the marriage of Bhargav & Latha.

Cast

Nandamuri Balakrishna as Bhargav 
Vijayashanti as Latha
Mandakini as Roja
Rao Gopal Rao as DIG Pratap Rao
Jaggayya as Chief Engineer Bhanogi Rao
Gollapudi Maruti Rao as Minister Raja Shekaram
Paruchuri Gopala Krishna as Minister's Brother 
Chandra Mohan as Shankaram
Ranganath as Tagore
Kota Srinivasa Rao as Sadanandam
Chalapathi Rao as Kallu Dasu
P. J. Sarma 
Suthi Velu as Anjineelu
Mallikarjuna Rao as Customs Officer
MVS Harinath Rao as DEO
Hema Sundar 
Bhimiswara Rao as Janardhan 
Jaya Bhaskar as Doctor
Eeswar Rao as Asst Engineer
Ramana Reddy as Kallu Dasu's son
Chitti Babu 
Annapurna as Parvathi
Mucharlla Aruna as Padma
Mahija as typist
Rekha

Soundtrack

Music composed by Chakravarthy. Lyrics written by Veturi. Music released on AVM Audio Company.

Others
 VCDs and DVDs on - KAD Video Company, Hyderabad

References

1987 films
Films directed by A. Kodandarami Reddy
Films scored by K. Chakravarthy
1980s Telugu-language films